Ryan Lynch is an American politician and a Democratic member of the Montana Senate. He previously served in the Montana House of Representatives

References

Members of the Montana House of Representatives
21st-century American politicians
Year of birth missing (living people)
Place of birth missing (living people)
Living people